(1844 – November 14, 1909) was a Japanese educator of the early Meiji era. Born in Aizu, she was the sister of the karō, Yamakawa Hiroshi; her other siblings included physicist Yamakawa Kenjirō and Meiji-era social figure Ōyama Sutematsu. Futaba took part in the defense of Tsuruga Castle in the Boshin War (1868-9). She was also briefly married to Kajiwara Heima, another Aizu karō.

For her work in education, she was awarded with junior 5th court rank (従五位, ju go i).

References
山川二葉 | 近代日本人の肖像 National Diet Library, Japan
Yamakawa Kenjiro (1931). Aizu Boshin senshi.

1844 births
1909 deaths
Japanese educators
Japanese women in warfare
People from Aizu
Women in 19th-century warfare 
Academic staff of Ochanomizu University
Japanese women educators
19th-century Japanese women